Greg Howe is the first studio album by guitarist Greg Howe, released in 1988 by Shrapnel Records. Prior to its recording, Howe had sent a demo tape to Shrapnel founder Mike Varney in 1987, after which he was signed to the label.

Critical reception

Andy Hinds at AllMusic described Greg Howe as "fresh compared to the melodramatic work of peers like, say, Vinnie Moore" and "a high-octane, indulgent rock romp. Worth hearing." He also listed "Kick It All Over" and "The Pepper Shake" as highlights. Martin Popoff in his Collector's Guide to Heavy Metal found the album "not all heavy, but for the most part, fruity, pop-tastic and colourful", while Howe's guitar playing reminded him of George Lynch.

In a 2009 article by Guitar World magazine, the album was ranked 10th on the all-time top 10 list of shred albums. As of 2006 it remains Howe's best-selling release.

Track listing

Personnel
Musicians
Greg Howe – guitar
Billy Sheehan – bass
Atma Anur – drums

Production
Steve Fontano – engineer, mixing
Mark "Mooka" Rennick – mixing
Joe Marquez, Marc Reyburn – assistant engineers
Steve Hall – mastering
Mike Varney – producer

References

External links
Greg Howe "Greg Howe" at Guitar Nine

Greg Howe albums
1988 debut albums
Shrapnel Records albums
Albums produced by Mike Varney